Nesetorio Jonny Schuster (born 17 January 1964) is a former international rugby league and rugby union player, a dual-code international. 

Schuster played for Marists Saint-Joseph, then six times for Samoa before leaving for New Zealand in 1984. From 1987 to 1990 he played for the All Blacks. In the 1990's he switched to rugby league.

Background
Schuster was born in Apia, Samoa.

References

External links

1964 births
Living people
Auckland rugby union players
Dual-code rugby internationals
Expatriate rugby league players in Australia
Expatriate rugby league players in England
Halifax R.L.F.C. players
New Zealand expatriate rugby league players
New Zealand expatriate sportspeople in Australia
New Zealand expatriate sportspeople in England
New Zealand international rugby union players
New Zealand sportspeople of Samoan descent
New Zealand rugby union players
Newcastle Knights players
Rugby league centres
Rugby league wingers
Samoa international rugby union players
Samoa national rugby league team captains
Samoa national rugby league team players
Samoan rugby league players
Sportspeople from Apia
Samoan expatriate sportspeople in England
Samoan expatriate sportspeople in Australia
Samoan expatriate rugby league players